Brett Duprez (born 1975) is a former Australian international lawn bowler.

Bowls career
Duprez won the gold medal in the pairs at the 1998 Commonwealth Games in Kuala Lumpur.

He has twice won medals at the World Bowls Championship, a bronze in the pairs at the 2000 World Outdoor Bowls Championship and a silver in the fours at the 2004 World Outdoor Bowls Championship.

He won double gold at the 1999 Asia Pacific Bowls Championships in Kuala Lumpur.

Retirement and awards
He announced his international retirement in 2005. He was inducted into the Bowls NSW Hall of Fame in 2012. 

In 2018 Bowls NSW named The Brett Duprez Development Series, a NSW 7-a- side competition, after him.

References

Living people
1975 births
Australian male bowls players
Commonwealth Games medallists in lawn bowls
Commonwealth Games gold medallists for Australia
Bowls players at the 1998 Commonwealth Games
20th-century Australian people
Medallists at the 1998 Commonwealth Games